The Women's Flat Track Derby Association Apprentice was the program affiliate of the Women's Flat Track Derby Association (WFTDA). In operation from 2009 until early 2019, the Apprentice Program served to onboard new member leagues into the WFTDA. In February 2019, the WFTDA announced it was retiring the program, to be replaced with a new "New Member Program" in the near future.

History
In July 2009, the WFTDA announced its new apprentice program for aspiring member leagues that replaced its traditional membership application process. The program is designed to act as a "WFTDA 101" tutorial, and will match new leagues with an established WFTDA mentor, who will guide the apprentice through the processes and requirements necessary to becoming a full member. Upon completion of the program, apprentice leagues will have the knowledge (and the recommendations) needed to apply for full WFTDA membership. The program ensures that applicants adhere to WFTDA standards for games, events and structure, and once accepted into the WFTDA, member teams qualify for international rankings.

In November 2009 the WFTDA opened for worldwide membership and the London Rollergirls became the first league outside North America to join as apprentice members.

In June 2010, the WFTDA announced the first round of Apprentice league graduates, and formed two new regions outside of the United States.

Graduate leagues
Note: some leagues have changed their names since graduation from the Apprentice Program. The names of such leagues at the time of their graduation are preserved in the table below.

Former members
Former Apprentice Program member leagues who left the program and did not become full WFTDA members are listed below.

Notes

Non-profit organizations based in the United States
Organizations established in 2009
Women's Flat Track Derby Association Apprentice